Dolná Poruba is a village and municipality in Trenčín District in the Trenčín Region of north-western Slovakia.

History
In historical records the village was first mentioned in 1355.

Geography
The municipality lies at an altitude of 427 metres and covers an area of 22.688 km². It has a population of about 845 people.

Genealogical resources

The records for genealogical research are available at the state archive "Statny Archiv in Bratislava, Slovakia"

 Roman Catholic church records (births/marriages/deaths): 1753-1895 (parish B)

See also
 List of municipalities and towns in Slovakia

External links
https://web.archive.org/web/20080111223415/http://www.statistics.sk/mosmis/eng/run.html
Surnames of living people in Dolna Poruba 
Genealogy; Slovakia; Dolna Pouba;

Villages and municipalities in Trenčín District